The 2001–02 First League of FR Yugoslavia was the tenth and last full season of the FR Yugoslavia's top-level football league since its establishment. It was contested by 18 teams, and Partizan won the championship.

Teams 
Budućnost Podgorica, Napredak Kruševac, Radnički Niš, and Milicionar, were relegated to the Second League of FR Yugoslavia.

The relegated teams were replaced by 2000–01 Second League of FR Yugoslavia champions, Mladost Apatin (North), Zvezdara (East), Mladost Lučani (West) and Rudar Pljevlja (South).

League table

Results

Winning squad
Champions: Partizan Belgrade (Coach: Ljubiša Tumbaković)

Players (appearances/goals)
  Radovan Radaković
  Vuk Rašović
  Dragoljub Jeremić
  Igor Duljaj
  Dejan Ognjanović
  Milan Stojanoski
  Goran Trobok
  Andrija Delibašić
  Zvonimir Vukić
  Damir Čakar
  Miladin Bečanović
  Radiša Ilić
  Nenad Mišković
  Ivan Stanković
  Aleksandar Nedović
  Ivica Iliev
  Vladimir Ivić
  Ajazdin Nuhi
  Saša Ilić
  Dejan Rusmir
  Branko Savić
  Branimir Bajić
  Ljubiša Ranković
  Milan Milijaš
  Milivoje Ćirković
  Danko Lazović
  Đorđe Pantić

Top goalscorers

References

Exdternal links 
 Tables and results at RSSSF

Yugoslav First League seasons
Yugo
1